Przysieka may refer to the following places:
Przysieka, Gniezno County in Greater Poland Voivodeship (west-central Poland)
Przysieka, Konin County in Greater Poland Voivodeship (west-central Poland)
Przysieka, Lesser Poland Voivodeship (south Poland)
Przysieka, Wągrowiec County in Greater Poland Voivodeship (west-central Poland)
Przysieka, Lubusz Voivodeship (west Poland)